Macksville High School is a government-funded co-educational comprehensive secondary day school, located in Macksville, in the Mid North Coast region of New South Wales, Australia.

Established in 1950, the school enrolled approximately 500 students in 2018, from Year 7 to Year 12, of whom 12 percent identified as Indigenous Australians and three percent were from a language background other than English. The school is operated by the NSW Department of Education; the principal is Erica Lyne.

Overview 
The school was established in 1950 and 50 year celebrations were held in 2000.

In March 1971, the high school was the site of a siege in which a 19-year-old held police at bay with a .22 calibre rifle for almost three hours.

The school has a sister school relationship with Jambi Sumatera, Indonesia.

Notable alumni
 Rear Admiral Mark BonserAustralian senior naval officer
 Tony Colepublic servant who served as the Secretary of the Australian Treasury between 1991 and 1993
 Phillip Hughescricketer; his funeral was held at the high school
 Greg Inglisrugby league football player
 Billie McKaychef who won series 7 of MasterChef Australia in 2015

See also

 List of government schools in New South Wales
 List of schools in Northern Rivers and Mid North Coast
 Education in Australia

References

External links
 
 NSW Schools website

Public high schools in New South Wales
1950 establishments in Australia
Educational institutions established in 1950